Man Hunt is a 1941 American thriller film directed by Fritz Lang and starring Walter Pidgeon and Joan Bennett. It is based on the 1939 novel Rogue Male by Geoffrey Household and is set in Europe just prior to the Second World War.  Lang had fled Germany into exile in 1933 and this was the first of his four anti-Nazi films, which include Ministry of Fear, Hangmen Also Die!, and Cloak and Dagger. It was Roddy McDowall's first Hollywood film after escaping London following the Blitz. Man Hunt was one of many films released in 1941 that were considered so pro-British that they influenced neutral members of the U.S. public to sympathize with the British side in World War II.

The film portrays Britain's pre-war policy of appeasement with Germany in its willingness to  extradite one of its own citizens without any defense, and its depiction of Nazi agents freely walking about London, impersonating police, and terrorizing civilians.

The story was filmed again under its original title, Rogue Male (1976), by the BBC in a version starring Peter O'Toole.

Plot
On July 29, 1939, renowned British big-game hunter Captain Alan Thorndike slips through the forest undetected near the Berghof, Adolf Hitler's residence near Berchtesgaden. With Hitler in his telescopic sight, he pulls the trigger on his unloaded rifle and gives a wave. He ponders a moment, then loads a live round, but is discovered at the last second by a guard, and the shot goes wide.

After being beaten, Thorndike is taken to Major Quive-Smith, who is also a devoted hunter and an admirer of Thorndike. Thorndike explains that he was not trying to kill, but did it just for the thrill of going after the biggest game of all. The major is unsure whether to believe him and insists that he sign a confession that he was working for the British government. When Thorndike refuses, he is tortured, but remains steadfast and warns of "questions being asked in high places" if he is killed, as his brother Lord Risborough is a very important diplomat. Quive-Smith arranges to have Thorndike pushed off a cliff to make his death look like suicide.

Thorndike survives when his knapsack gets caught in a tree, breaking his fall. He eludes his pursuers and reaches a port. He steals a rowing boat, but is forced to abandon it when a patrol boat comes near. He swims to a Danish ship about to sail for London. British cabin boy Vaner helps Thorndike hide aboard. The Germans find Thorndike's coat and passport aboard the rowboat and search the nearby ship. Though they find nothing, they place agent Mr. Jones on board using Thorndike's passport to continue searching after the ship departs.

Jones is met by German agents in London. Thorndike, mistakenly believing he is safe, casually disembarks and is spotted. He manages to hide in the apartment of a young woman called Jerry Stokes who lends him money so that he can reach his brother.

When Lord Risborough tells his brother that the British government, continuing its pre-war policy of appeasement, would have to extradite him if he were found, Thorndike decides to hide in Africa. Jerry tries to refuse a large reward, leading Lady Risborough to assume that it is payment for other services, but Thorndike insists. He also buys her a new hatpin, as she had lost hers when they first met. She chooses a cheap chromium arrow and insists that Thorndike present it to her. Thorndike likens it to her, saying both are "straight and shiny". By this point, Jerry is in love.

Quive-Smith arrives in London to join the hunt. When Thorndike calls on his solicitor, Saul Farnsworthy, the Nazis are once again on his trail. Chased into a London Underground station, Thorndike struggles with Jones, who is killed when he is thrown onto an electrified rail.

Thorndike tells Jerry to have Lord Risborough send him a letter in three weeks to the care of the Lyme Regis post office. Thorndike hides in a cave, but then tries to pick up the letter, alarming the postmistress. Thorndike grabs the letter and retreats back to his cave, where he finds that the letter is from Quive-Smith, who has followed him to his lair.

Quive-Smith seals the only entrance and passes Thorndike the confession and a pen through an airhole, threatening to leave him trapped inside. Quive-Smith slides in Jerry's beret with the arrow pin, informing Thorndike that she was thrown out a window to her death when she would not betray him. The Germans found him by using the address that Thorndike had written for Jerry. Badgered by Quive-Smith, Thorndike finally admits that he subconsciously intended to assassinate Hitler. He then agrees to sign the confession. Quive-Smith unblocks the entrance, but waits to shoot Thorndike as he crawls out. However, Thorndike uses his belt, a slat from his bed and a stick to fabricate a bow, using Jerry's pin as the tip of a makeshift arrow, and shoots Quive-Smith through the airhole. When Thorndike emerges, Quive-Smith wounds him before dying. By the time Thorndike recovers, the war has started.

Thorndike joins the Royal Air Force as a Bomber Command crewman. On a mission over Germany, he parachutes out with his hunting rifle.

Cast
 Walter Pidgeon as Captain Thorndike
 Joan Bennett as Jerry Stokes
 George Sanders as Quive-Smith
 John Carradine as Mr. Jones
 Roddy McDowall as Vaner
 Ludwig Stössel as the doctor 
 Heather Thatcher as Lady Risborough
 Frederick Worlock as Lord Risborough
 Roger Imhof as Captain Jensen
 Egon Brecher as the jeweler
 Lester Matthews as the major
 Holmes Herbert as Saul Farnsworthy
 Eily Malyon as the postmistress
 Arno Frey as the police lieutenant
 Frederick Vogeding as ambassador 
 Wilhelm von Brincken as the harbor police chief 
 Cyril Delevanti as the cab driver (uncredited)
 Olaf Hytten as Piel, Saul's law clerk (uncredited)

Production
Man Hunt became the first war film to attract the attention of the Hays Office in the neutral United States. Joseph Breen was alarmed by the script, calling it a "hate film". Breen felt that in the isolationist atmosphere of the 1941 U.S., the film showed all Germans as evil, unlike other films that depicted both good non-Nazi Germans as well as evil Nazis. Breen insisted that the Germans should not be characterised as being so brutal and that the office would pass the film only if it would "indicate" brutality rather than show it. As a result, Thorndike's torture was not shown, but the idea was made apparent to the audience.

Darryl F. Zanuck was also worried about Lang's anti-Nazi enthusiasm and banned him from the editing room. However, Lang and his associate Gene Fowler, Jr. secretly edited the film without Zanuck's approval.

Isolationists and Nazi sympathizers took issue with the film, along with That Hamilton Woman (1941) and others, describing such films as pro-British propaganda to change American public opinion about going to war.

The film features an instrumental version of "A Nightingale Sang in Berkeley Square" by Eric Maschwitz, Manning Sherwin and Jack Strachey as a recurring romantic theme. The score's recurring theme for the Nazis was composed by the film's musical director Alfred Newman.

Response
Bosley Crowther, writing for The New York Times in June 1941, commented that "Man Hunt rates somewhat above the run of ordinary 'chase' films" projecting "certain subtle psychological overtones", but "it doesn't fulfill its possibilities completely". Dave Kehr reviewing a DVD release in the same publication in 2009, commented "as agitprop the film could not be more effective", but "it also has the timeless quality of a work of pure imagination".

Preservation
The Academy Film Archive preserved Man Hunt in 2000.

Radio adaptation
Man Hunt was presented on Philip Morris Playhouse July 31, 1942, starring Robert Montgomery.

See also
 Rogue Male, the 1976 BBC television version of Household's novel
 Operation Foxley, a British Special Operations Executive plan to assassinate Hitler in 1944

Notes

External links
 
 
 
 
 Man Hunt review at Mystery*File (David L. Vineyard)
 Man Hunt DVD review, The New York Times, May 15, 2009 (Dave Kehr)

1940s English-language films
1940s German-language films
1940s multilingual films
1940s thriller films
1941 films
20th Century Fox films
American black-and-white films
American multilingual films
American political thriller films
American World War II propaganda films
Cultural depictions of Adolf Hitler
Films about assassinations
Films about hunters
Films about Nazi Germany
Films based on British novels
Films directed by Fritz Lang
Films set in 1939
Films set in Bavaria
Films set in London
Films with screenplays by Dudley Nichols
World War II films made in wartime